According to the Book of Mormon, Teancum was a Nephite military leader. He is described in the Book of Alma between Alma 50:35 and Alma 62:40 (inclusive). According to LDS teachings, he is known for the assassinations of King Amalickiah and the subsequent assassination of Amalickiah's brother, Ammoron, seven years later. The Book of Mormon states that in time he proved to be a great chief captain in the Nephite army. He also appears as a major character in the Tennis Shoes Adventure Series, a series of LDS fiction novels.

Book of Mormon account

Battle with Morianton 

The Book of Mormon narrative states that between the years between 71 and 68 BC, there was much peace in the land of the Nephites. The exception was a dispute that began to grow in the land of Lehi and the land of Morianton, which were neighboring lands. The inhabitants of the land of Morianton claimed ownership of a part of the land of Lehi. The dispute grew and eventually led to the inhabitants of Morianton attacking the inhabitants of Lehi, led by a man called Morianton. The people of Lehi fled from the attack to the camp of Captain Moroni.

Morianton's forces were afraid that Captain Moroni and his army would attack, so they changed their course and attempted to take the land in the North. Captain Moroni caught hold of the plan when one of Morianton's maid servants, whom he had physically abused, escaped from him and allied herself with Captain Moroni. As a preventative measure, Captain Moroni dispatched a contingent of soldiers led by Teancum in order to stop Morianton and his people from fleeing to the North. In the battle which ensued, Teancum killed Morianton and defeated his army, afterward taking prisoners. He then made an oath with the prisoners, allowing them to go back to their homes if they would "keep the peace. "

Assassination of Amalickiah 

Later in the narrative, the leader of the Lamanite army, a military leader called Amalickiah had been taking possession of many Nephite cities which were located on the eastern borders by the seashore. As his army was moving North and capturing Nephite cities, Teancum was marching south with his army attempting to take back those cities. The two armies came to a head on the seashore.

The soldiers of Teancum, skilled and well trained in the ways of warfare, quickly gained the upper hand on Amalickiah's armies during the day and drove them back toward the beaches. Amalickiah's army then pitched their tents on the beach and slept for the night. During the night, Teancum and his servant secretly infiltrated the camps of the Lamanites. After a brief search for the tent of the Lamanite king, Teancum threw a javelin at Amalickiah, which struck him in the heart, killing him instantly. Teancum then successfully fled back to his camp without being detected.

Upon returning to his camp, the victorious Teancum awakened his armies and caused them to prepare for battle with the Lamanite forces. When the Lamanite army awoke that morning, they found their leader dead, which caused the army to retreat back to the city of Mulek for protection.

Retaking of the city of Mulek 

Teancum was next sent to attack the city of Mulek, a Nephite city located south of Bountiful that was captured by the Lamanites. Mulek had been fortified by Captain Moroni before falling into the hands of Amalickiah and thus was a stronghold for the Lamanite forces. Immediately following the demise of Amalickiah, the Lamanite army that was contending with Teancum's army abandoned their attempt to capture Bountiful and retreated to the city of Mulek.

While Teancum was employed in preparing for war, he received orders from Captain Moroni to attempt a retake of the city of Mulek. However, upon marching with his armies into Mulek, he observed that his army was not prepared to contend with the Lamanites in their fortified city. He then returned to Bountiful and awaited the arrival of Captain Moroni and his forces.

When Captain Moroni later arrived with his armies, he called many chief captains of the Nephite forces together for a war council. A strategy was then devised that would cause Teancum to take a small force and march near the city as a decoy while Captain Moroni and his forces would retake Mulek. The operation was successful and the leader of this Zoramite-Lamanite army was killed. The city of Mulek was again in the possession of the Nephites.

Assassination of Ammoron and death 

The Book of Mormon states that a large battle occurred after the retaking of the city of Nephihah from the Lamanites. In the narrative, Teancum's forces marched to meet the Lamanites with the armies of Lehi and Captain Moroni. Both sides were greatly fatigued because of the long march. Teancum was angered by Amalickiah and Ammoron for starting the war. He believed if he were to kill Ammoron, the Lamanite army would accept defeat. He, in striking similarity with his previous encounter with Amalickiah, went out into the night and let himself over the wall using a rope. He crept into Ammoron's tent, threw a javelin at him, and struck him near the heart. The blow, however, was not immediately fatal and Ammoron cried out, awakening his servants. Teancum fled, but the servants of the king chased him and killed him. His death was greatly mourned by Captain Moroni and Lehi.

Town 

According to the Book of Mormon, Teancum is also the name of a Nephite town that played an important role during the war in Mormon's time. The narrative states that the Lamanites drove the Nephites out of Teancum and took possession of it.

See also 

 Helaman
 Stripling Warriors

Notes

External links 
 Teancum - Book of Mormon index entry
 Book of Alma on the wikisource website

Book of Mormon people